The Navayuga Group is an Indian multinational conglomerate headquartered in Hyderabad, with diversified portfolio that includes public infrastructure in roads, bridges, metro rail, marine works, IT/ITES companies, ports, power projects and steel units. It was founded by Mr C. Visweswara Rao in the year 1986.

History 

Navayuga Group started its operations in the year 1986 as a private limited company.

Group companies 

 Navayuga Engineering Company Limited (NECL)
 Krishnapatnam Port Company Limited (KPCL) 
 Navayuga Aviation Private Limited (NAPL)
 Navayuga Infotech
 Navayuga Power
 Navayuga Steel
 Navayuga Real
 Navayuga Spatial Technologies

Navayuga Infotech

Navayuga Infotech is an IT company headquartered in Hyderabad, India and is part of the Navayuga Group of companies. Navayuga Infotech started its operations in the year 1997 as a private limited company. In 1998, it started its new division Digitrans in India to provide healthcare BPO Services and Navtech Consulting in USA to provide IT Staffing Services to its clients. It then expanded operations to Middle East and Africa.
Navayuga Infotech has offices in USA, Middle East, South Africa, Kenya and Namibia.
It is a CMMI Level 5 and ISO 9001 certified.

Key engagements 

 Implementation of Integrated Port Management System  for Transnet National Ports Authority (TNPA) for all its eight ports across South Africa.
 Implementation for Airport Management System  for Airports Authority of India across 96 airports.
 Implementation of e-Municipality System for Itanagar Municipal Council.

References

Companies based in Hyderabad, India
Indian companies established in 1986
Navayuga Group
1986 establishments in Andhra Pradesh